Times Square Comes Alive is a 1985 pornographic film directed by Vince Benedetti and starring Veronica Vera and Tasha Voux.

Overview
Television reporter Christine Career of 69 Minutes takes an investigative look into the sex industry of Times Square.

References

External links

Times Square Comes Alive scene at YouTube

1985 films
Films about pornography
1980s English-language films
Films set in the 1980s
Fiction set in 1985
1980s pornographic films
Films set in New York City
American pornographic films
1980s American films